Dove Creek is a Statutory Town that is the county seat and the most populous municipality of Dolores County, Colorado, United States. The town population was 635 at the 2020 United States Census. The community takes its name from the nearby Dove Creek. Dove Creek is the self-proclaimed Pinto Bean Capital of the World.

History
The Old Spanish Trail trade route passed through the area of Dove Creek from 1829 into the 1850s.

A post office at Dove Creek has been in operation since 1915.

There are several area prehistoric and historic sites listed on the Colorado State Register of Historic Properties:
 Brewer Archaeological District of two large prehistoric settlement sites: Brewer Mesa Pueblo (11th century) and Brewer Canyon Pueblo (13th century)
 Glade Ranger Station, dated before 1910
 P.R. Butt & Sons Building, built in 1914, generally considered the town's second building

Geography
Dove Creek is located in western Dolores County at  (37.765994, -108.905691).

The town is located on US 491 (formerly US 666) at the crossing of Dove Creek, the town's namesake. Dove Creek flows south to Cross Canyon, Montezuma Creek, Utah, and the San Juan River. The town is located on the northern portion of the Great Sage Plain, a large plateau covered in desert lands, bounded by the La Plata Mountains, Mesa Verde National Park, the La Sal Mountains, and the Abajo Mountains, and cut by dozens of deep canyons, which was and is a productive agricultural region. The plateau is dotted with numerous ruins of the Anasazi and other ancient people who took advantage of good soils and terrain, even with limited water resources.

The Dolores County Courthouse, built in 1957, replaces a temporary courthouse in the town used after voters of the county moved the county seat from Rico to Dove Creek in 1947, reflecting a shift in the original mining-oriented make-up of the county's population to the current situation in which farmers and a few ranchers outnumber the mountain-dwellers in the old mining districts of the eastern end of Dolores County. The courthouse is adjacent to Dolores County High School, and is part of the old business district located north of US 491; most business is now located on US 491 as it angles through the town from east-southeast to west-northwest. A regional landmark is the large concrete bean elevator located on the west edge of town, near the Dolores County Industrial Park.
SH 141 intersects US 491 just west of town, and provides access to the Paradox Valley, Nucla-Naturita, and the uranium mining and industrial area of Montrose County, Colorado, and Grand County, Utah.

Demographics

As of the census of 2000, there were 698 people, 285 households, and 202 families residing in the town. The racial makeup of the town was 96.28% White, 1.86% Native American, 0.29% from other races, and 1.58% from two or more races. Hispanic or Latino of any race were 3.87% of the population.

There were 285 households, out of which 31.2% had children under the age of 18 living with them, 54.4% were married couples living together, 13.0% had a female householder with no husband present, and 28.8% were non-families. 26.0% of all households were made up of individuals, and 14.4% had someone living alone who was 65 years of age or older. The average household size was 2.45 and the average family size was 2.93.

In the town, the population was spread out, with 26.6% under the age of 18, 7.9% from 18 to 24, 24.4% from 25 to 44, 22.3% from 45 to 64, and 18.8% who were 65 years of age or older. The median age was 39 years. For every 100 females, there were 97.2 males. For every 100 females age 18 and over, there were 91.0 males.
The median income for a household in the town was $27,500, and the median income for a family was $32,813. Males had a median income of $28,333 versus $17,500 for females. The per capita income for the town was $13,015. About 8.9% of families and 12.3% of the population were below the poverty line, including 9.9% of those under age 18 and 16.0% of those age 65 or over.

Economy 

The Dolores County Industrial Park is located west of Dove Creek and is the site of a plant which began construction in 2007, which produces food-grade vegetable oil from sunflowers, safflower, and canola grown in the Dove Creek area, and will ultimately produce biodiesel. The industrial park is home to the community's first ready-mix plant in many decades, and other businesses. New housing developments have been permitted and platted in the Dove Creek area, anticipating growth due to efforts like this. On the eastern edge of the town is the headquarters and facility of Adobe Milling, a company marketing various locally-grown beans and other traditional Southwestern foods.

Major employers in the town include the county government and school district, and various other government agencies. Most businesses in town support agricultural operations; some provide transportation services for highway users.

Community News 

The Dove Creek Press is an 824-circulation weekly newspaper, locally owned and operated by Kathleen "Kat" Keesling since January 2017. The Press office is located at 321 Main St, Dove Creek, CO 81324. The Press' website is https://www.dovecreekpress.com/

According to Keesling, the Dove Creek Press was first published May 10, 1940, on eight broadsheet pages. The owners were Dan Hunter and R.T. Williams. The cost of a subscription was $2 per year. The Ladies Civic Club held a subscription drive, receiving 25¢ per subscription in return. The newspaper was printed in house. It was a broadsheet typical of that era, 21 inches tall by 14 ½ inches wide. The newspapers were frequently a sideline for printers.

The sheets to print newspapers were pre-printed on one side, blank on the other. The pre-printed side was national news, politics, Washington news, frequently a weekly fictional story, question and answer sections, recipes, sewing patterns, and even national classified ads. The newspaper publisher would print the local news on the blank side, fold it, and prepare it for mailing.

The inside pre-printed section included: fighting in Germany, Swedish practicing defense maneuvers, White House report, first three chapters of a fiction story called “Marked Man” by HC Wire, Navy report, solicit for Air Hostesses, help for chronic pain, cigarette ads, a “Dear Mrs. Norris” help column for wives, sewing pattern

Local ads were: Ford Tractor for $585, Dove Creek Garage (vehicle repair), Village Blacksmith, JC Denton General Merchandise (Pleasant View), Abbotts Auto Repair (Cortez), Quality Cleaners (dry cleaning and tailoring, Cortez), Dove Creek Merc, Barrett Auctioneer (Cortez), Dale’s Blacksmith, Mexirado Distributing (wholesale petroleum products, Cortez), Owl Café and Bar (Cortez), JJ Harris and Company Bankers (Dolores), Charlie’s Fresh Meat and Groceries (and apartments, Cortez), Romer Merc and Grain, The Cortez Sentinel, AW Denny (Farmall tractors, Cortez), Frosty’s Quality Groceries, Clearing for Sage brush and tree stumps, FA Sitton (Dove Creek brand pinto beans), Dove Creek Texaco Service Station, Dove Creek Café, Dove Creek’s Pioneer Merchant, Keunzler Korner (gasoline), Fred’s Repair Shop (garage work), typewriter repair (Cortez), CH Webb Insurance (Dolores), Dove Creek Lumber and Hardware, Walt’s Welding, Ralph the Desert Rat (water hauling 25¢ a barrel), Dove Creek Barber, John J. Downey Attorney at Law (Cortez), Agnes’ Beauty Shop, Stanley Wilson Cedar Posts, and Dean’s Service Station.

See also

Colorado
Bibliography of Colorado
Index of Colorado-related articles
Outline of Colorado
List of counties in Colorado
List of municipalities in Colorado
List of places in Colorado

References

External links

Town of Dove Creek website
CDOT map of the Town of Dove Creek
Dove Creek Press - Newspaper and Publisher for Dolores County

Towns in Dolores County, Colorado
Towns in Colorado
County seats in Colorado
Old Spanish Trail (trade route)